The Esteemed Order of the Crown of Pahang (Malay:  Darjah Kebesaran Mahkota Pahang Yang Amat Mulia) is a knighthood order of the Sultanate of Pahang.

History 
The order was founded by Sultan Abu Bakar on 27 December 1968. It is awarded to individuals who have rendered meritorious service to the State.

Classes 
There are four classes of the order:

 Grand Knight (Sri Indera Mahkota Pahang, post-nominal letters : SIMP)
 Knight Companion (Darjah Indera Mahkota Pahang, post-nominal letters : DIMP)
 Companion (Setia Mahkota Pahang, post-nominal letters : SMP)
 Member (Ahli Mahkota Pahang, post-nominal letters : AMP)

Recipients

Grand Knights (S.I.M.P.)
The grand knights receives the title Dato' Indera and his wife Datin Indera

 1972: Ghazali Shafie
 1972: Abdul Rahman Ya'kub
 1981: Mohd Ghazali Mohd Seth
 1981: Mohammed Hanif Omar
 1985: Abdul Hamid Omar 
 1985: Mohd Khalil Yaakob
 1985: Kurnia Bija Sura Low Keng Huat
 1985: Mohamed Al-Hamad Al-Shubaili
 1985: Mohd. Amin bin Osman
 1985: Penggawa Ungku Tan Sri Dato' Nasaruddin bin Mohammad	
 1985: Sulaiman Daud
 1986: A.P. Arumugam
 1986: Chan Siang Sun	
 1986: Tengku Seri Wangsa Raja Tengku Mohd Salim bin Tengku Omar
 1987: Ahmad Razali Mohd Ali
 1987: Lim Goh Tong
 1987: Mohamed Rahmat
 1988: Elyas Omar
 1988: Mohamed Hashim Mohd Ali
 1988: Tengku Nong Fatimah binti Sultan Haji Ahmad Shah
 1988: Sabbaruddin Chik
 1988: Tengku Panglima Besar Pahang Tengku Abdul Khalid ibni Almarhum Sultan Abdullah
 1988: Tengku Panglima Perang Pahang Haji Tengku Ismail bin Tengku Muhamad
 1988: Wong Nyuk Shing @ Wong Teck Tsin
 1989: Munir Abu Bakar
 1989: Vincent Tan
 1989: Lim Ah Lek
 1990: Abdul Aziz Abdul Rahman
 1990: Ahmad Sarji Abdul Hamid
 1990: Brian H.E. Cristopher
 1990: Jaffar bin Hussein
 1990: Dr. Joao Havelange
 1990: Lin Tung - Kuo
 1990: Mohd Yunus Mohd Tasi
 1990: Dr. Richard Wolffe Emanuel
 1990: Hajah Tengku Shahariah binti Sultan Haji Ahmad Shah
 1990: Tan Beng Tong
 1990: Tengku Panglima Perang Tengku Abdul Aziz ibni Al Marhum Sultan Abu Bakar
 1990: Wan Sidek bin Haji Wan Abdu Rahman
 1993: Abdul Rahim Mohd Noor
 1997: Norian Mai
 2007: Koh Hong Sun
 2007: Abdul Razak Bokhari
 2008: Mohamad Fuzi Harun

Knight Companions (D.I.M.P.)
The Knight Companions receives the title Dato''' and his wife Datin''

 1970: Ghazali Shafie
 1971: Ibrahim Ismail
 1985: Abdul Rahman bin Hamzah	
 1985: Bahari bin Tan Sri Dato' Haji Yahaya	
 1985: Dusuki bin Haji Ahmad
 1985: Ho Thian Hock
 1985: Ismail bin Dato' Abdullah
 1985: Khairi bin Haji Mohamad	
 1985: Long Ahmad Zainalabidin bin Mohd. Tahir
 1985: Mansor Mohd Noor
 1985: Murad Hashim
 1985: Nik Abdul Rashid bin Nik Abdul Majid
 1990: Ismail Omar
 1996: Gopal Sri Ram
 1998: Jamil Osman
 2004: Abdul Aziz bin Kasim
 2004: Abdul Rahim Jaafar
 2004: Hadi Ho Abdullah
 2004: Khalid Abu Bakar
 2004: Koh Hong Sun
 2004: Mohamad Fuzi Harun
 2006: Acryl Sani Abdullah Sani
 2006: Mohd Mokhtar Mohd Shariff
 2006: Mohd Shukri Dahlan
 2006: Jamil Osman
 2007: Abdul Hamid Bador
 2008: David Arumugam
 2010: Mazlan Lazim
 2011: Huzir Mohamed
 2014: Law Hong Soon
 2014: Fatimah Ghazali
 2015: Zahari Sarip
 2020: Shahrul Nizam Abdul Aziz
 2022: Izwan Hasli bin Mohd Ibrahim

See also 
 Orders, decorations, and medals of the Malaysian states and federal territories#Pahang
 Orders, decorations, and medals of Pahang
 List of post-nominal letters (Pahang)

References 

Orders of chivalry of Malaysia
Orders, decorations, and medals of Pahang